Ormea is a comune (municipality) in the Province of Cuneo in the Italian region Piedmont, located about  south of Turin and about  southeast of Cuneo.

Ormea borders the following municipalities: Alto, Armo, Briga Alta, Caprauna, Cosio di Arroscia, Frabosa Soprana, Garessio, Magliano Alpi, Nasino, Pornassio, Roburent, and Roccaforte Mondovì.

See also  
 Monte Armetta
 Monte della Guardia

References

Cities and towns in Piedmont